The following table indicates declared Indonesian government national holidays. Cultural variants also provide opportunity for holidays tied to local events. Beside official holidays, there are the so-called "libur bersama" or "cuti bersama", or joint leave(s) declared nationwide by the government. In total there are 16 public holidays every year.

List of national public holidays

Other observances
In addition to the official holidays, many religious, historical, and other traditional holidays populate the calendar, as well as observances proclaimed by officials and lighter celebrations. These are often observed by businesses and schools as holidays.

See also

Balinese saka calendar
Islamic calendar - for further expansion on the months and days identified above
Javanese calendar
List of festivals in Indonesia

References

Cited works

 
Lists of events in Indonesia
Indonesia
Indonesia culture-related lists